Jegish Yegoian (born 28 January 1993) is a Dutch-Armenian heavyweight kickboxer. He is the former I.S.K.A. World Heavyweight champion and the 2013 Superkombat World Grand Prix IV Tournament winner.

Kickboxing career
Yegoian achieved his first notable win in October 2013, when he defeated Mustapha Hachioni by decision. He would go on to win his next three fights, including a notable win over D'Angelo Marshall. He then entered the 2013 Superkombat World Grand Prix IV. He beat Ibrahim Aarab by split decision in the semifinal, and won the tournament with a unanimous decision win against Thomas Vanneste. This victory earned him a place in the Superkombat Final Elimination tournament, facing Redouan Cairo in the quarterfinals. Cairo won the fight by unanimous decision.

In his next fight, Yegoian fought Horace Martin for the W.F.C.A. Thaiboxing World Heavyweight title. Martin won the fight by a second round knockout.

After his failed title bid, Yegoian won his next fight against Marcello Adriaansz by majority decision. He continued trading wins and losses, losing to Tomasz Sarara, defeating Dennis Stolzenbach and losing once again to Sergio Piqué.

In 2015, Yegoian fought in three straight title fights. He first won the ISKA World heavyweight oriental rules title with an extra round decision win against Athanasios Kasapis, which was followed with a decision win against Clyde Brunswijk to win the King Of Almere championship. In his last fight of 2015, Yegoian beat Jeroen de Groot by a second round knockout to win the IRO World Muay Thai championship.

Yegoian fought with Tatneft Cup in 2019, defeating Sergey Mavliutov by a third round knockout in the first round of the 2019 Cup. He took part in the tournament as a replacement for Roman Kryklia, while Mavliutov came in as a replacement for Enver Šljivar, who was sidelined with visa issues. In the Tatneft Cup quarterfinals, he won an extra round decision against Gokhan Gedik. He briefly fought away from Tatneft, losing a unanimous decision to Artur Gorlov at Glory 66. He was supposed to fight Francesco Xhaja in the Tatneft Cup semifinal, but was forced to withdraw with an arm fracture, suffered during training.

Titles
2016 IRO World Muay Thai Champion
2015 I.S.K.A. Oriental Rules World Heavyweight Champion (-100 kg; 220 lbs)
2013 Superkombat World Grand Prix IV Tournament Champion

Kickboxing record

|-
|-  bgcolor="#CCFFCC"
| 2019-08-24 || Win ||align=left| Gokhan Gedik  || 2019 Tatneft Cup, Quarterfinal || Kazan, Tatarstan|| Decision (Extra round) || 4 || 3:00
|-
|-  bgcolor="#FFBBBB"
| 2019-06-22 || Loss ||align=left| Artur Gorlov || Glory 66: Paris || Paris, France|| Decision (Unanimous) || 3 || 3:00
|-
|-  bgcolor="#CCFFCC"
| 2019-02-21 || Win ||align=left| Sergey Mavlyutov || 2019 Tatneft Cup First Round || Kazan, Tatarstan|| KO || 3 || 
|-
|-  bgcolor="#FFBBBB"
| 2017-03-18 || Loss ||align=left| Luis Tavares || Enfusion Live 47 || Nijmegen, Netherlands|| Decision (Unanimous) || 3 || 3:00
|-
|-  bgcolor="#CCFFCC"
| 2016-10-08 || Win ||align=left| Jeroen de Groot || Warriors Part 4 || Norg, Netherlands|| KO || 2 || 
|-
! style=background:white colspan=9 |
|-
|-  bgcolor="#CCFFCC"
| 2015-11-28 || Win ||align=left| Clyde Brunswijk || Ring Strs || Almere, Netherlands || Decision || 5 || 3:00
|-
! style=background:white colspan=9 |
|-
|-  bgcolor="#CCFFCC"
| 2015-09-12 || Win ||align=left| Athanasios Kasapis || Its Fight Time II || Germany, Darmstadt|| Ext. R. Decision (unanimous) || 6 || 3:00
|-
! style=background:white colspan=9 |
|-
|-  bgcolor="#FFBBBB"
| 2015-06-27 || Loss ||align=left| Sergio Piqué || Ringstars Event Gala || Almere, Netherlands || Decision || 5 || 3:00
|-
! style=background:white colspan=9 |
|-
|-  bgcolor="#CCFFCC"
| 2015-02-07 || Win ||align=left| Dennis Stolzenbach || Enfusion Live 24 || Eindhoven, Netherlands|| Decision || 3 || 3:00
|-
|-  bgcolor="#FFBBBB"
| 2014-10-25 || Loss ||align=left| Tomasz Sarara || Pride of the Royal City || Krakow, Poland || Decision (Unanimous) || 3 || 3:00
|-
|-  bgcolor="#CCFFCC"
| 2014-09-27 || Win ||align=left| Marcello Adriaansz || SUPERKOMBAT World Grand Prix IV 2014 || Almere, Netherlands || Decision (majority) || 3 || 3:00
|-
|-  bgcolor="#FFBBBB"
| 2014-04-21 || Loss ||align=left| Boy Boy Martin || Born 2 Fight || Elst, Netherlands || KO || 2 || 
|-
! style=background:white colspan=9 |
|-
|-  bgcolor="#FFBBBB"
| 2013-11-09 || Loss ||align=left| Redouan Cairo || SUPERKOMBAT World Grand Prix 2013 Final Elimination, Quarter Finals || Ploiești, Romania || Decision (Unanimous) || 3 || 3:00
|-
|-  bgcolor="#CCFFCC"
| 2013-10-12 || Win ||align=left| Thomas Vanneste || SUPERKOMBAT World Grand Prix IV 2013, Final || Giurgiu, Romania || Decision (unanimous)|| 3 || 3:00
|-
! style=background:white colspan=9 |
|-
|-  bgcolor="#CCFFCC"
| 2013-10-12 || Win ||align=left| Ibrahim Aarab || SUPERKOMBAT World Grand Prix IV 2013, Semi Finals || Giurgiu, Romania || Decision (split)|| 3 || 3:00
|-
|-  bgcolor="#CCFFCC"
| 2013-06-29 || Win ||align=left| D'Angelo Marshall || Death Before Dishonor - Part III || Almere, Netherlands || Decision || 3 || 3:00
|-
|-  bgcolor="#CCFFCC"
| 2011-12-10 || Win ||align=left| Mitchel Tramper || 2 the MAXX || Hoogeveen, Netherlands || Decision|| 3 || 3:00
|-
|-  bgcolor="#CCFFCC"
| 2011-10-09 || Win ||align=left| Youssef el Yacoubi || Death before Dishonor 2 || Almere, Netherlands || Decision|| 5 || 2:00
|-
|-  bgcolor="#CCFFCC"
| 2010-10-03 || Win ||align=left| Mustapha Hachioni || Memento Mori part 1 || Rotterdam, Netherlands || Decision|| 5 || 2:00
|-
|-
| colspan=9 | Legend:

See also
List of It's Showtime events
List of It's Showtime champions
List of male kickboxers

References

1993 births
Living people
Armenian male kickboxers
Dutch male kickboxers
Heavyweight kickboxers
Armenian Muay Thai practitioners
Dutch people of Armenian descent
Sportspeople from Almere
SUPERKOMBAT kickboxers